"Everything which is not forbidden is allowed" is a legal maxim. It is the concept that any action can be taken unless there is a law against it. It is also known in some situations as the "general power of competence" whereby the body or person being regulated is acknowledged to have competent judgement of their scope of action. The general power of competence operates in most states and societies as it is much easier to specify what cannot be done, than listing what can be done.

The opposite principle "everything which is not allowed is forbidden" states that an action can only be taken if it is specifically allowed.

A senior English judge, Sir John Laws, stated the principles as: "For the individual citizen, everything which is not forbidden is allowed; but for public bodies, and notably government, everything which is not allowed is forbidden." Legal philosopher  put it this way: "In a closed system in which all obligations are stated explicitly the following inference rules are valid: (XI) Everything which is not forbidden is allowed".

Domestic law

Germany
In discussion of German law, an argument often found is that a juristic construction is not applicable since the law does not state its existence – even if the law does not explicitly state that the construction does not exist. "riding in the forest").

United Kingdom 
In the United Kingdom, the Ram Doctrine is a former constitutional doctrine based upon a 1945 memorandum by Granville Ram. Part of it reads:

The doctrine is also mentioned in Halsbury's Laws of England (though not explicitly by name) and the Cabinet Manual. 

In R v Secretary of State for Health, ex parte C [2000] 1 FLR 627, it was found that despite the fact the Department of Health (as it was then known) that had no statutory authority to maintain an unpublished but consulted (by employers in the child care field) database, it was not unlawful for it do so.

De Smith's Judicial Review is critical of the doctrine and a 2013 House of Lords Constitution Committee report suggests that Ram's memorandum is not an accurate depiction of the law today and that the phrase "the Ram doctrine" is inaccurate and should no longer be used.

Local authorities in England 
The converse principle—"everything which is not allowed is forbidden"—used to apply to public authorities in England, whose actions were limited to the powers explicitly granted to them by law. The restrictions on local authorities were lifted by the Localism Act 2011 which granted a "general power of competence" to local authorities.

Coronavirus epidemic
In March 2021, in response to the Coronavirus disease 2019, the Health Secretary Matt Hancock reportedly advised the Prime Minister Boris Johnson in the following terms: "We've got to tell people that they can't do anything unless it is explicitly allowed by law." This advice has been described a "radical suggestion", and Hancock himself reportedly described it as Napoleonic, "flipping" British tradition, because in lockdown people would be forbidden from doing anything unless the legislation said, in terms, that they could. Whilst the foregoing is merely reported, the Coronavirus Act 2020 and hundreds of pieces of subordinate legislation made pursuant to that Act prima facie abrogated the principle in the United Kingdom, and this has been confirmed by other writers including Adam Wagner, a barrister specialising in human rights and public law.  Lord Sumption, a former judge of the Supreme Court, stated in a lecture given on 27 October 2020 that "The ease with which people could be terrorized into surrendering basic freedoms which are fundamental to our existence as social beings came as a shock to me in March 2020".

United States 

In the US, similar restrictions on municipal authorities apply as a consequence of Dillon's rule.

International law 
In international law, the principle is known as the Lotus principle, after a collision of the S.S. Lotus in international waters.  The Lotus case of 1926–1927 established the freedom of sovereign states to act as they wished, unless they chose to bind themselves by a voluntary agreement or there was an explicit restriction in international law.

Derived principles and sayings
The totalitarian principle in physics adapts the phrase to read: "Everything not forbidden is compulsory." 

The Robert Heinlein 1940 short story "Coventry" uses a similar phrase to describe an authoritarian state: "Anything not compulsory was forbidden". The 1958 version of T. H. White's The Once and Future King describes the slogan of an ant-hill as being "Everything not forbidden is compulsory". 

A jocular saying is that, in England, "everything which is not forbidden is allowed", while in Germany, the opposite applies, so "everything which is not allowed is forbidden". This may be extended to France—"everything is allowed even if it is forbidden".

See also
Entick v Carrington
 Exception that proves the rule
 Kompetenz-kompetenz
 Legal certainty
 Nulla poena sine lege, no penalty without a law
 Reserved powers
 Rule of law
 Tenth Amendment to the United States Constitution, the principle of federalism and states' rights
 Vagueness doctrine

References

Civil rights and liberties
Constitutional law
English law
Legal doctrines and principles
Political philosophy
el:Φιλελεύθερη αρχή